Thrixspermum, commonly known as hairseeds or 白点兰属 (bai dian lan shu), is a genus of flowering plants in the family Orchidaceae. Orchids in this genus are epiphytes, lithophytes or terrestrial plants with flat, leathery leaves and short-lived flowers with the sepals and petals more or less similar to each other. The labellum is rigidly fixed to the column and has three lobes. The side lobes are erect and the middle lobe is thick and fleshy. There are about 190 species distributed from tropical and subtropical Asia to the Western Pacific. Most species grow in lowland or tropical rainforests up to an altitude of 1,200 m.

Description
Orchids in the genus Thrixspermum are epiphytic or lithophytic, rarely terrestrial, monopodial herbs with long thick roots, and flat, fleshy leaves arranged in two ranks with their bases sheathing the stem. The flowers are arranged on a pendulous or arching flowering stem arising from a leaf axil. The flowers are usually short-lived and often open for less than a day. The sepals are free from and more or less similar to each other. The petals are free from each other and similar to, but slightly shorter than the sepals. The labellum is stiffly attached to the column with a pouched base and three lobes, the side lobes erect, usually short and blunt and the middle lobe thick and fleshy. The fruit is a long, thin capsule.

Taxonomy and naming
The genus Thrixspermum was first formally described in 1790 by João de Loureiro in Flora Cochinchinensis. The name Thrixspermum is derived from the Ancient Greek words , meaning "hair" and  meaning "seed".

Species
The following is a list of species of Thrixspermum recognised by the World Checklist of Selected Plant Families as at January 2019:

 Thrixspermum aberrans Schltr. 1913
 Thrixspermum acuminatissimum (Rchb. f.) Rchb.f. 1868
Thrixspermum acuminatissimum subsp. acuminatissimum
Thrixspermum acuminatissimum subsp. affine (Schltr.) P.O'Byrne & Gokusing (2016)
 Thrixspermum acutilobum J.J.Sm.  1921
 Thrixspermum agamense J.J.Sm.  1927
 Thrixspermum agusanense Ames  1915
 Thrixspermum alabense J.J.Wood (2010)
 Thrixspermum amesianum L.O.Williams 1938
 Thrixspermum amplexicaule (Bl.) Rchb. f. 1867
 Thrixspermum anceps (Blume) Rchb.f. (1868)
 Thrixspermum ancoriferum (Guillaumin) Garay (1972)
 Thrixspermum angustatum L.O.Williams  1938)
 Thrixspermum angustifolium (Blume) Rchb.f. (1868)
 Thrixspermum anjunganense P.O'Byrne (2016)
 Thrixspermum annamense ( Guillaum. ) Garay 1972
 Thrixspermum arachnitiforme Schltr. 1921
 Thrixspermum aurantiacum J.J.Sm. 1920
 Thrixspermum bicolor P.O'Byrne, P.T.Ong & J.J.Verm. (2015)
 Thrixspermum borneense (Rolfe) Ridl. (1896)
 Thrixspermum bosuangii P.O'Byrne & Gokusing (2016)
 Thrixspermum brevibracteatum J.J.Sm. 1928
 Thrixspermum brevicapsularis Holttum  1947
 Thrixspermum brevicaule Carr  1929
 Thrixspermum brevipes Schltr.  1913
 Thrixspermum breviscapum (Carr) Kocyan & Schuit. (2014)
 Thrixspermum bromeliforme W.Suarez (2009)
 Thrixspermum brunnescens (Ridl.) J.J.Sm. (1933)
 Thrixspermum calceolus (Lindl.) Rchb.f. (1868)
 Thrixspermum canaliculatum J.J.Sm. (1914)
 Thrixspermum carinatifolium (Ridl.) Schltr. (1911)
 Thrixspermum carnosum (K.Schum.) Schltr. (1911)
 Thrixspermum caudatum P.O'Byrne & Gokusing (2016)
 Thrixspermum celebicum Schltr.  1911
 Thrixspermum centipeda Lour 1790
 Thrixspermum cerinum (Ridl.) J.J.Sm. (1933)
 Thrixspermum chanianum P.O'Byrne & Gokusing (2016)
 Thrixspermum clavatum (J.Koenig) Garay (1972)
 Thrixspermum clavilobum J.J.Sm.  1928
 Thrixspermum collinum Schltr.  1913
 Thrixspermum complanatum (J.Koenig) Schltr. (1911)
 Thrixspermum congestum  (Bailey) Dockrill  1967
 Thrixspermum conigerum J.J.Sm.  (1921)
 Thrixspermum cootesii W.Suarez (2009)
 Thrixspermum cordulatum J.J.Sm. 1927
 Thrixspermum corneri Holttum  1947
 Thrixspermum crassifolium Ridl.
 Thrixspermum crassilabre (King & Pantl.) Ormerod 2004
 Thrixspermum crescentiforme Ames &  C.Schweinf.  1920
 Thrixspermum cryptophallon P.O'Byrne & J.J.Verm. (2015)
 Thrixspermum cymboglossum Schltr. 1911
 Thrixspermum denticulatum Schltr. 1906 
 Thrixspermum doctersii J.J.Sm.  1914
 Thrixspermum duplocallosum Holttum  1947
 Thrixspermum elmeri L.O.Williams 1938
 Thrixspermum elongatum Ames 1915
 Thrixspermum erythrolomum P.O'Byrne & J.J.Verm. (2008)
 Thrixspermum eximium L.O.Williams  1938
 Thrixspermum fantasticum L.O.Williams  1938
 Thrixspermum fernandeziae Cootes, Cabactulan & M.Leon (2017)
 Thrixspermum filifolium Schltr.  1911
 Thrixspermum filiforme (Hook.f.) Kuntze (1891)
 Thrixspermum fimbriatum (Ridl.) J.J.Wood  1994
 Thrixspermum flaccidum J.J.Sm. 1920
 Thrixspermum fleuryi (Gagnep.) Tang & F.T.Wang (1951)
 Thrixspermum formosanum (Hayata) Schltr. (1919)
 Thrixspermum fragrans Ridl.  1921
 Thrixspermum fulgens (Ridl.) Schltr. (1911)
 Thrixspermum fuscum (Ridl.) Merr. (1921)
 Thrixspermum gombakense J.J.Sm.  1928
 Thrixspermum gracilicaule Schltr.  1907
 Thrixspermum graeffei Rchb.f.
 Thrixspermum grandiflorum P.O'Byrne & J.J.Verm. (2008)
 Thrixspermum hiepii Aver. & Averyanova(2006)
 Thrixspermum hystrix (Blume) Rchb.f.(1874)
 Thrixspermum incurvicalcar J.J.Sm.  1926
 Thrixspermum indicum Vik.Kumar, D.Verma & A.N.Rao (2017)
 Thrixspermum indragiriense Schltr.  1907
 Thrixspermum inquinatum J.J.Sm.  1907
 Thrixspermum integrum L.O.Williams  1938
 Thrixspermum iodochilus Ridl.  1922
 Thrixspermum japonicum (Miq.) Rchb. f. 1878 
 Thrixspermum javanicum J.J.Sm.  1921
 Thrixspermum kipandicum P.O'Byrne & Gokusing (2016)
 Thrixspermum kjellbergii J.J.Sm.  1933
 Thrixspermum kocyanii J.J.Wood & A.L.Lamb (2011)
 Thrixspermum lampongense J.J.Sm. 1917
 Thrixspermum lanatum P.O'Byrne & Gokusing (2016)
 Thrixspermum latifolium J.J.Sm.  1917
 Thrixspermum latisaccatum J.J.Sm.  1920
 Thrixspermum lengguanianum P.T.Ong & P.O'Byrne (2011)
 Thrixspermum leucorachne Ridl.
 Thrixspermum ligulatum L.O.Williams  1938
 Thrixspermum linearifolium Ames  1915
 Thrixspermum lingiae P.O'Byrne & Gokusing (2016)
 Thrixspermum linusii J.J.Wood & A.L.Lamb (2011)
 Thrixspermum lombokense J.J.Sm.  1925
 Thrixspermum longicauda Ridl.
 Thrixspermum longilobum J.J.Sm. 1920
 Thrixspermum longipedicellatum (Joongku Lee, T.B.Tran & R.K.Choudhary) Kocyan & Schuit. (2014)
 Thrixspermum longipilosum J.J.Sm.  1922
 Thrixspermum loogemanianum'' Schltr.  1911
 Thrixspermum lucidum Schltr.  1911
 Thrixspermum luciferum P.O'Byrne & J.J.Verm. (2004)
 Thrixspermum maculatum Schltr.  1906
 Thrixspermum majus (Carr) Kocyan & Schuit. (2014)
 Thrixspermum malayanum J.J.Sm.  1921
 Thrixspermum megacarpum P.O'Byrne, A.L.Lamb & P.T.Ong (2015)
 Thrixspermum merapohense P.O'Byrne & P.T.Ong (2015)
 Thrixspermum mergitiferum P.O'Byrne & J.J.Verm. (2004)
 Thrixspermum merguense (Hook.f .) Kuntze 1996
 Thrixspermum milneri P.O'Byrne & Gokusing (2016)
 Thrixspermum montanum Ridl.  1913
 Thrixspermum multicolor (Ridl.) Merr. (1921)
 Thrixspermum musciflorum A.S.Rao & Joseph  1971
 Thrixspermum obtusum (Blume) Rchb.f. (1868)
 Thrixspermum ochraceum P.O'Byrne, P.T.Ong & J.J.Verm. (2015)
 Thrixspermum odoratum X.Q.Song, Q.W.Meng & Y.B.Luo (2009)
 Thrixspermum olidum P.O'Byrne (2016)
 Thrixspermum pachychilum P.O'Byrne & Gokusing (2016)
 Thrixspermum pardale (Ridl.) Schltr. (1911)
 Thrixspermum patens J.J.Sm.  1921
 Thrixspermum pauciflorum (Hook.f.) Kuntze (1891)
 Thrixspermum pensile Schltr.  1911
 Thrixspermum pinocchio P.O'Byrne & J.J.Verm. (2008)
 Thrixspermum platycaule Holttum (1947)
 Thrixspermum platystachys  (F.M. Bailey) Schltr. 1911
 Thrixspermum poilanei (Gagnep.) Tang & F.T.Wang (1951)
 Thrixspermum ponapense Tuyama 1940
 Thrixspermum psiloglottis (Ridl.) Schltr. (1911)
 Thrixspermum pugionifolium (Hook.f.) Schltr. (1911)
 Thrixspermum pulchellum (Thwaites) Schltr. (1911)
 Thrixspermum pulchrum Carr  1932
 Thrixspermum pulverulentum (Carr) Kocyan & Schuit. (2014)
 Thrixspermum punctatum (Ridl.) J.J.Sm. (1933)
 Thrixspermum purpurascens Rchb. f.
 Thrixspermum pusillum (Guillaumin) Garay (1972)
 Thrixspermum pygmaeum (King & Pantl.) Holttum (1960)
 Thrixspermum quinquelobum Ames 1915
 Thrixspermum raciborskii J.J.Sm
 Thrixspermum raciborskii subsp. brevipollinium P.O'Byrne & Ent (2016)
 Thrixspermum raciborskii subsp. raciborskii Thrixspermum recurvum (Hook.f.) Kuntze (1891)
 Thrixspermum remotiflorum J.J.Sm. 1906
 Thrixspermum rimauense J.J.Wood & A.L.Lamb (2011)
 Thrixspermum rimiae P.O'Byrne & Ent (2016)
 Thrixspermum robinsonii Ames  1915
 Thrixspermum roseum J.J.Sm.  1918
 Thrixspermum rostratum Ames 1915
 Thrixspermum rubrocalcaratum P.O'Byrne & Gokusing (2016)
 Thrixspermum saccatum P.O'Byrne & J.J.Verm. (2008)
 Thrixspermum sagoense J.J.Sm. 1928
 Thrixspermum samarindae Schltr. 1906
 Thrixspermum sarawakense Ames (1921)
 Thrixspermum sarcophyllum Garay (1974)
 Thrixspermum saruwatarii (Hayata) Schltr. 1919
 Thrixspermum scandens P.O'Byrne (2016)
 Thrixspermum scopa (Rchb.f. ex Hook.f.) Holttum (1947)
 Thrixspermum scortechinii (Hook.f.) Kuntze (1891)
 Thrixspermum semiteretifolium J.J.Wood & A.L.Lamb (2010)
 Thrixspermum simum J.J.Sm.  1927
 Thrixspermum squarrosum J.J.Sm.  1921
 Thrixspermum stelidioides Aver. & Averyanova (2006)
 Thrixspermum subteres J.J.Sm.
 Thrixspermum subulatum (Blume) Rchb.f. (1868)
 Thrixspermum sumatranum J.J.Sm.  1920
 Thrixspermum sutepense (Rolfe ex Downie) Tang & F.T.Wang (1951)
 Thrixspermum tahanense Carr 1930
 Thrixspermum taianum P.O'Byrne & P.T.Ong (2015)
 Thrixspermum tenuicalcar Carr 1932
 Thrixspermum teretifolium P.O'Byrne & J.J.Verm. (2008)
 Thrixspermum torajaense P.O'Byrne  1998
 Thrixspermum tortum J.J.Sm.  1914
 Thrixspermum triangulare Ames &  C.Schweinf. 1920
 Thrixspermum trichoglottis (Hook.f.)Kuntze 1896
 Thrixspermum tsii  W.H.Chen  &  Y.M.Shui 2005
 Thrixspermum tubulatum P.O'Byrne (2016)
 Thrixspermum tylophorum Schltr. 1911
 Thrixspermum validum J.J.Sm. 1908
 Thrixspermum vanoverberghii Ames  1914
 Thrixspermum ventricosum J.J.Wood & A.L.Lamb (2011)
 Thrixspermum walkeri Seidenf.  &  P.Ormerod  1995
 Thrixspermum warianum Schltr. 1913
 Thrixspermum weberi Ames 1922
 Thrixspermum wenzelii Ames  1915
 Thrixspermum westenenkii (J.J.Sm.) Kocyan & Schuit. (2014)
 Thrixspermum williamsianum (Kores) Ormerod (1996)
 Thrixspermum xantholeucum Schltr.
 Thrixspermum xantholomum P.O'Byrne & J.J.Verm. (2008)
 Thrixspermum zollingeri (Rchb.f.) Rchb.f. (1868)

Distribution
Orchids in the genus Thrixspermum'' are found in China, Japan, Korea, the Ryukyu Islands, Taiwan, India (including the Andaman and Nicobar Islands), Bangladesh, Nepal, Sri Lanka, Cambodia, Laos, Myanmar, Thailand, Vietnam, Borneo, Indonesia, Malaysia, the Philippines, New Guinea, the Solomon Islands, northern Australia (including Christmas Island), Fiji, New Caledonia, Samoa, Vanuatu and the Caroline Islands. About fourteen species, two of which are endemic occur in China, nine are found in Taiwan and three in Australia.

References

 
Vandeae genera
Epiphytic orchids